The 1997–98 Murray State Racers men's basketball team represented Murray State University during the 1997–98 NCAA Division I men's basketball season. The Racers, led by third-year head coach Mark Gottfried, played their home games at Racer Arena in Murray, Kentucky, as members of the Ohio Valley Conference. They finished the season 29–4, 16–2 in OVC play to win the OVC regular season title. They defeated  to win the OVC tournament to advance to the NCAA tournament. As No. 9 seed in the Midwest region, the Racers were beaten by No. 8 seed and eventual Elite Eight participant Rhode Island, 97–74.

Roster

Schedule and results

|-
!colspan=9 style=| Regular season

|-
!colspan=9 style=| Ohio Valley Conference tournament

|-
!colspan=9 style=| NCAA tournament

|-

Rankings

Awards and honors
De'Teri Mayes  OVC Player of the Year

References

Murray State Racers men's basketball seasons
Murray State
Murray State
Murray State
Murray State